Duplicity is the debut full-length studio album by English trance metal band Silent Descent. It was released on March 12, 2008. A music video was made for the title track "Duplicity."

Track listing

Personnel

Band members
 Tom Watling - lead vocals
 Tom Callahan - guitar, backing vocals, producer
 Paul Hurrell - keyboard, synths, backing vocals
 Mr. G - disk jockey, samples
 Jack "Jaco" Oxley - lead guitar, backing vocals
 Sniffles - bass
 Dave Carter - drums

2008 debut albums
Silent Descent albums